Schoolcraft College is a public community college in Livonia, Michigan.

History
Schoolcraft College was established in 1961. Originally named Northwest Wayne County Community College, the name of the college was changed because of the length. On February 6, 1963, the college officially changed the name to Schoolcraft College, after an American geologist Henry Schoolcraft. The school's name omits the word "community", both to keep the name short, and to avoid the assumption on the part of the public that the school is located in or associated with Schoolcraft County.

Academics
Schoolcraft College is known for its culinary arts program and continuing education. The culinary department is headed by four certified master chefs (CMC) which is the highest CMC/Student ratio of any culinary school in the country.

The Schoolcraft Connection is the student-run campus newspaper.

Athletics
Schoolcraft College Athletic program is a part of the National Junior College Athletic Association via the Michigan Community College Athletic Association. The athletic teams' name is the Ocelots.

Administration
Some noteworthy public figures have served on the Schoolcraft College Board of Trustees in the past. They include Congressman Thaddeus McCotter of Livonia and former State Senator Laura M. Toy of Livonia. The value of its endowment as of June 30, 2011 was $10.659 million.

Business engagement
Schoolcraft College's Business Development Center hosts several programs for regional businesses. The center is composed of the Schoolcraft College Procurement Technical Assistance Center (PTAC), the Small Business Development Center (SBDC) of Schoolcraft College, and Workforce Training Solutions.

Schoolcraft College Procurement Technical Assistance Center (PTAC)
The Schoolcraft College PTAC is funded through a cooperative agreement with the United States Department of Defense, State of Michigan and Schoolcraft College. The PTAC provides free government contracting assistance to businesses in selling products and services to federal, state, and local government agencies. The Center assists companies headquartered in Oakland County and most of Wayne County, excluding the City of Detroit and Downriver Communities.

The Schoolcraft College PTAC operates satellite offices at Automation Alley and the Oakland County government's One Stop Shop Business Center.

Public Sector Construction Forum (PSCF) 
The Public Sector Construction Forum (PSCF) was established in 2016 with the support and assistance of the Schoolcraft College PTAC and Wayne State University PTAC. The Forum engages local public and private sector representatives, including small business owners. The Forum discusses industry trends, federal and state spending, contractor diversity and methods to expand the success of public sector construction - both vertical and horizontal - from a stakeholder and private industry perspective throughout the State of Michigan and Great Lakes region. The current Chairman of the Forum is Alexander Masters.

See also
 Other community colleges in Wayne County  
 Wayne County Community College District (Detroit, Downriver, and eastern Wayne County)
 Henry Ford College (Dearborn)

References

External links

Community colleges in Michigan
Michigan Community College Athletic Association
Universities and colleges in Wayne County, Michigan
Livonia, Michigan
Educational institutions established in 1961
1961 establishments in Michigan
Two-year colleges in the United States